Atul Sachdeva (born 22 August 1980 in Preston, Lancashire) is an English cricketer. Sachdeva was a right-handed batsman and a leg break bowler.

Sachdeva represented Leicestershire in a single first-class match in 1999 against Derbyshire. Sachdeva was unbeaten on 0 when Leicestershire's first innings came to an end. In their second innings he was dismissed for a duck by Matthew Cassar. In Derbyshire's second innings, he took the wicket of Cassar. This was his only wicket in first-class cricket.

References

External links
Atul Sachdeva at Cricinfo
Atul Sachdeva at CricketArchive

1980 births
Living people
Cricketers from Preston, Lancashire
English cricketers
Leicestershire cricketers
British Asian cricketers
British sportspeople of Indian descent